Suli Moa (born 31 December, 1986) is a New Zealand playwright, actor, screenwriter and teacher of Tongan descent. He wrote and performed the first Tongan Play in New Zealand, Kingdom of Lote. As a playwright Moa has been awarded the Adam New Zealand Play Award for Best Pacific Play, 12th Round (2016), and Tales of a Princess (2018). Moa's acting credits include A love yarn (2021) and Sweet Tooth (2021). His writing credits include The Panthers (2021) and Shortland Street (2021-2022). Moa has also appeared in multiple short films as an actor and served as a cultural advisor.

Early life 
Born on 31 December, 1986, Moa is the second of three children. His father was a factory worker from the village of Fahefa (Tongatapu) and his mother was a dishwasher, from the village of Fangale'ounga (Ha'apai) in Tonga. Moa grew up in Glen Innes, East Auckland, then moved to New Lynn where he began schooling at New Lynn Primary School in West Auckland, in 1991. He attended Avondale Intermediate and finished his secondary schooling at Saint Kentigern College on a scholarship.

Biography 
In 2007 Moa began studying at Toi Whakaari in Wellington, and graduated with a BA in performing arts (Acting) in 2009. He furthered his studies at The University of Auckland, where he completed a Diploma in Teaching Secondary Drama & Dance in 2011. Since graduating, Moa has taught at several secondary schools in Auckland as a Drama and English teacher at Marcellin College and Westlake Girls High School. 

Moa wrote, acted and staged the first Tongan play in New Zealand, Kingdom of Lote, at Mangere Arts Centre. The Matala Festival was established in 2012 by Moa and Sesilia Pusiaki (actor and choreographer) to platform and amplify the stories of the Tongan community through a theatre, visual arts and poetry. In the same year, Moa and his wife Natalie Moa established their own theatre company, Tales From the Kava Bowl (TFTKB) where their first play written by Moa, A Hearts Path, was staged as part of the Matala Festival at Mangere Arts Centre in Auckland. The Matala Festival also included a performance from poet Karlo Mila. 

For his contributions to Tongan theatre in New Zealand, Moa was awarded the Emerging Artist award from Creative New Zealand. In 2016, Moa received an Adam NZ Play Award for his piece 12th Round, produced by TFTKB at Circa Theatre, Wellington.

In 2018, he was awarded Best Play by a Pasifika Playwright for his play Tales of A Princess, a story highlighting the 2009 tragedy of the ship Princess Ashika. This show toured the Tongan church communities within Auckland. In 2020 Moa premiered his most recent theatre piece, BURNING OPINION at the Auckland Fringe Festival, based on the 2006 Nuku'alofa riots. The show went on to win Best Ensemble and PAANZ ready to tour at the Fringe awards.

Filmography

Films & Short films

Television Series

Theatre

References 

New Zealand actors
1986 births
Living people
21st-century Tongan people
University of Auckland alumni
New Zealand screenwriters
New Zealand male dramatists and playwrights